Daru is a town in Kailahun District in the Eastern Province of Sierra Leone with a population of 5,958 (2010 estimate) Daru lies approximately 25 miles (40 kilometers) to Kenema

Daru is home to one of the largest military barracks in Sierra Leone. The vast majority of the people in the town are from the Mende ethnic group. Home of late Hon. Maigore Kallon, former chairman of SLPP, former member of Parliament and former minister of Foreign affairs in the Kabba administration. One of the sons of Daru, Jawie, Maigore Kallon Jr, is also a community health officer, graduated from Njala University, from the school of community health sciences.

Steady Bongo, one of the most popular Sierra Leonean musicians, was born and raised in Daru.
And Samuel Swarray clinical officer at Medicine sans frontier is also an indigene of jawie.

The chiefdom is known for a unique culture, Goldtree ltd. Is a palm tree company that produces palmoil and palm kernel oil also located in the chiefdom, very close to Daru.

Transport 

Daru was formerly the terminus of a now closed railway line from the capital.

Climate and vegetation
The community has a typical monsoon climate type which is the same as the Southeastern region of the country. It experiences longer period of rainy season and high amount of rainfall. The dry season normally starts at November and ends in March whist the rest is considered wet season. This makes the soil of the chiefdom or district very arable and fertile and allows the cultivation of many crops. It has a normal temperature of 26 °C and humility of 92%. 
Daru lies along the rain forest zone in the country.

The community was once surrounded with thick forested, but this forest had been replaced by palm-trees and farm bush over the years due to farming activities. Presently, the community is largely surrounded by palm-tree plantation owned by the Goldtree Plantation Ltd. Swamps and grassland comprised the remaining vegetation of the community.

See also 

 Transport in Sierra Leone

Notes

Populated places in Sierra Leone
Eastern Province, Sierra Leone